was a daimyō during mid-Edo period Japan.

Biography
Matsudaira Nobutoki was the eldest son of Matsudaira Nobuteru, the daimyō of Koga Domain in Shimōsa Province. He was given the adult name of Nobutaka in 1694, and did not change his name to Nobutoki until 1719.

On December 18, 1697, he was granted Lower 5th Court Rank and the courtesy title of Kai-no-kami. On the death of his father on June 18, 1709, he became daimyō of Koga Domain and head of the Ōkōchi-branch of the Matsudaira clan. A few days later, his courtesy title changed to Izu-no-kami. On July 12, 1712, he was transferred to Yoshida Domain in Mikawa Province, with a rise in revenues to 70,000 koku.

On February 2, 1729, he was appointed Osaka jōdai and his Court Rank was increased to Lower 4th. On February 15, 1729, he was transferred to Hamamatsu Domain in Tōtōmi Province. On July 11, 1730, he was elevated to the rank of Rōjū in the service of Shōgun Tokugawa Yoshimune. His courtesy title was also upgraded to Chamberlain.

Matsudaira Nobutoki was married to a daughter of Sakai Tadataka, the daimyō of Maebashi Domain.

References 
 Papinot, Edmund. (1906) Dictionnaire d'histoire et de géographie du japon. Tokyo: Librarie Sansaisha...Click link for digitized 1906 Nobiliaire du japon (2003)
 The content of much of this article was derived from that of the corresponding article on Japanese Wikipedia.

|-

|-

|-

Fudai daimyo
Ōkōchi-Matsudaira clan
Osaka jōdai
Rōjū
1683 births
1744 deaths